Torsburgen, Tors borg or þors borg ("Thor's fort/castle") are the remains of an ancient hillfort in Kräklingbo on the Swedish island of Gotland in the Baltic Sea. The fort is featured in the Gutasaga. The plateau is also a nature reserve.

Geography 
Torsburgen is situated on, and encompasses the whole of, an eponymous plateau hill in the central east part of Gotland. With  steep cliffs in the west, north and east, it rises above the surrounding flat landscape. About 10,300–10,800 years ago it was a low island in the Baltic Ice Lake. The motions of that lake deposited gravel embankments in the southwest part of the plateau. Inside the embankments, now walls, has formed a small mire called Torsburgsmyr.

Another is Linnaeus' Cave, named after Carl Linnaeus who visited the hillfort in 1741. There is also the Rindarhulet. Rindi is Gutnish for ivy, a common plant on Gotland, and hulet means "the hole".

The hill and the surrounding area used to be covered with dense coniferous forest. Most of the forest was destroyed during the large Kräklingbo fire in the dry summer of 1992. Nevertheless, the area has given life to a wide variety of fire-dependent fungus, plants and insects, some of which are endangered species. Torsburgen has been ravaged by fires before. On his visit to the hill, Linnaeus noted that the plateau was almost void of trees. He was probably referring to the great fire of 1655, which ravaged the Alskog, Ala, Ardre and Kräklingbo sockens.

History 

The hillfort was originally constructed at the beginning of the 1st century AD. Reinforced during the 4th century, it was in use until c. 1100 AD. Another source, based on an archaeological survey done in the 1970s, dates the two stages of constructing the fort to 300 AD and 900 AD. Scholars estimate that nearly 1000 soldiers would have been needed to defend it  and it could have been providing refuge to the entire population of Gotland that is calculated to be between 6,000 and 10,000 in the early medieval period.

The enclosed area on Torsburgen is about twice the size of the land enclose by the Visby city wall. The fort follows the natural edge of the plateau. The steep cliffs provide a natural protection for the hillfort in the west, north and east part of the plateau, with reinforcements and constructed walls in some places. The area is known as "The Castle". The most western part of the wall is built of limestone slabs, while the southwest and south parts are made of limestone rubble and dirt. On top of the wall was a palisade of logs. The limestone used for building the wall was quarried on site at a small quarry in the north part of the plateau. It has been estimated that the wall would take 3,000 men a year to build. Very little archaeological work has been done on Torsburgen, most of it is unexamined. Only four small metal objects have been retrieved during a minor excavation in connection to a restoration of the stone work at Ardre luke in 1983.

There are several openings in the walls, in Gutnish called luke, each with its own name: 
 Tjängvide like
 Hajdeby luke
 Glose luke
 Ardre luke
 Halsgårde luke
 Ala luke

It has been suggested that Torsburgen was part of a defense system for lighting fire beacons on the many hill forts and plateau hills on the island, to warn the population about approaching enemy ships.

It was most likely created during the Late Roman Iron Age (200 - 400 AD), the walls surrounding the area of the hillfort were made of dry stone, rubble from boulders, limestone, and a raised beach. While other hillforts in Sweden are described as vitrified, meaning the remains were turned to a glasslike substance by exposure to heat, Torburgen is a calcined hillfort, the remains of this site were reduced by roasting, leaving a different sort of rubble behind– it is sandy, almost black and strongly magnetic. In the latter case, the residue was a clayey to silty, yellowish brownish material. It is suggested that the walls of this fort were destroyed by fire from enemies.

The fourth largest in Scandinavia and second largest on Gotland is the hillfort on Grogarnsberget.

Guta Saga 
In the exodus story of the Guta Saga, the mythological history of Gotland, a third of Gotland's residents once temporarily settled themselves in Torsburgen after they were ordered by the local government to move due to overpopulation concerns. These residents were eventually forced to leave Gotland altogether; they subsequently settled in Fårö and Hiiumaa before finally moving through Russia to Greece, where they became the descendants of the Goths.

Nature reserve 
In 1994, Torsburgen was designated as a nature reserve. The flora includes a number of plants that are rare in Sweden, such as hard shield-ferns, scorpion senna, Orobanche alba and the Pulsatilla vulgaris gotlandica; all of which survived the fire in 1992. On 30August 2005, the nature reserve became a Natura 2000 protected area. A number of endangered species of plants and insects on the IUCN Red List have been found within the area.

Gallery

References 

Buildings and structures in Gotland County
Geography of Gotland County
Nature reserves in Sweden
Hill forts in Sweden
Natura 2000 in Sweden